Chan Hao-ching and Kristina Mladenovic were the defending champions, but they decided not to participate.
Cara Black and Sania Mirza won the title, defeating Eva Hrdinová and Valeria Solovyeva in the final, 6–4, 6–3.

Seeds

Draw

Draw

References 
 Draw

Portugal Open - Doubles
Women's Doubles